Laura Legge, OOnt, QC (January 27, 1923 –October 5, 2010) was a recipient of the Order of Ontario in 2003.

Legge graduated from Osgoode Hall Law School in 1948 after earning a B.A. and a nursing degree. Legge received an honorary LLD from the Law Society of Upper Canada in 1988.

In 1955, she and her husband established the still active law firm of Legge & Legge.

Legge was elected the Law Society of Upper Canada's first female bencher in 1975. Legge was twice elected treasurer of the Law Society of Upper Canada.
She was the organization's first female head. Since 2007, the Law Society of Upper Canada has selected a recipient of the Laura Legge award to recognize women in Ontario who have exemplified leadership in the legal profession.

References

1923 births
2010 deaths
Canadian King's Counsel
Treasurers of the Law Society of Upper Canada
Judges in Ontario
Members of the Order of Ontario